This is the results breakdown of the local elections held in Cantabria on 22 May 2011. The following tables show detailed results in the autonomous community's most populous municipalities, sorted alphabetically.

City control
The following table lists party control in the most populous municipalities, including provincial capitals (shown in bold). Gains for a party are displayed with the cell's background shaded in that party's colour.

Municipalities

Santander
Population: 181,589

Torrelavega
Population: 55,888

See also
2011 Cantabrian regional election

References

Cantabria
2011